This is a list of the bird species recorded on Macquarie Island. The avifauna of Macquarie Island include a total of 74 species, of which 6 have been introduced. Of these, 8 species are globally threatened.

The birds of Macquarie Island are, unsurprisingly for an isolated oceanic island, predominantly seabirds.  By far the majority of the breeding species are penguins, petrels and albatrosses.  However, the bird list includes many vagrants, including passerines, from New Zealand and Australia.

Overview
Four species of penguin breed on Macquarie Island.  The royal penguin has a population estimated at 850,000.  There are also 100,000 breeding pairs of king penguin, the third largest such colony in the world.  Gentoo and southern rockhopper penguins also breed there.  In the past the penguins, mainly the royal and king penguins, were exploited for their oil, a practice which ceased in 1919.

The four breeding species of albatross are all threatened by long-line fishing when feeding away from the island, including the most numerous, the light-mantled sooty albatross with 2000 breeding pairs, and the wandering albatross, with fewer than ten pairs breeding each year.

Many species of petrel breed on Macquarie.  They were adversely affected by the introduction of black rats, house mice, rabbits and cats, and the small blue petrel breeding population on the island is considered to be critically endangered.  Wekas were introduced by sealers in the mid-19th century and flourished, adding to the predation threat, while the rabbits caused erosion of the hillsides.  With the eradication of first the cats and the wekas, and then of the rabbits and rodents by 2014, there are signs that the breeding petrel populations are beginning to recover.

The Macquarie Island parakeet became extinct about 1891.  The Macquarie Island rail, an endemic subspecies of the buff-banded rail, disappeared about the same time. The Pacific black duck population on Macquarie Island is threatened by crossbreeding with introduced mallards, a common problem on Australian and New Zealand islands.

This list's taxonomic treatment (designation and sequence of orders, families and species) and nomenclature (common and scientific names) follow the conventions of The Clements Checklist of Birds of the World, 2022 edition. The family accounts at the beginning of each heading reflect this taxonomy, as do the species counts found in each family account. Introduced and accidental species are included in the total counts for French Polynesia.

The following tags have been used to highlight several categories. The commonly occurring native species do not fall into any of these categories.

 (A) Accidental - a species that rarely or accidentally occurs on Macquarie Island
 (E) Endemic - a species that is native only to Macquarie Island
 (I) Introduced - a species introduced to Macquarie Island as a consequence, direct or indirect, of human actions

Ducks, geese, and waterfowl
Order: AnseriformesFamily: Anatidae

Anatidae includes the ducks and most duck-like waterfowl, such as geese and swans. These birds are adapted to an aquatic existence with webbed feet, flattened bills, and feathers that are excellent at shedding water due to an oily coating.

Pacific black duck, Anas superciliosa 
Mallard, Anas platyrhynchos (I)
Mallard x Pacific black duck hybrid, Anas platyrhynchos x superciliosa (I)
Grey teal, Anas gracilis (A)

Swifts
Order: CaprimulgiformesFamily: Apodidae

Swifts are small birds which spend the majority of their lives flying. These birds have very short legs and never settle voluntarily on the ground, perching instead only on vertical surfaces. Many swifts have long swept-back wings which resemble a crescent or boomerang.

White-throated needletail, Hirundapus caudacutus (A)
Pacific swift, Apus pacificus (A)

Rails, gallinules, and coots
Order: GruiformesFamily: Rallidae

Rallidae is a large family of small to medium-sized birds which includes the rails, crakes, coots and gallinules. Typically they inhabit dense vegetation in damp environments near lakes, swamps or rivers. In general they are shy and secretive birds, making them difficult to observe. Most species have strong legs and long toes which are well adapted to soft uneven surfaces. They tend to have short, rounded wings and to be weak fliers.

Eurasian coot, Fulica atra (A)
Baillon's crake, Zapornia pusilla (A)

Sandpipers and allies
Order: CharadriiformesFamily: Scolopacidae

Scolopacidae is a large diverse family of small to medium-sized shorebirds including the sandpipers, curlews, godwits, shanks, tattlers, woodcocks, snipes, dowitchers and phalaropes. The majority of these species eat small invertebrates picked out of the mud or soil. Variation in length of legs and bills enables multiple species to feed in the same habitat, particularly on the coast, without direct competition for food.

Ruddy turnstone, Arenaria interpres (A)
Latham's snipe, Gallinago hardwickii (A)

Skuas and jaegers
Order: CharadriiformesFamily: Stercorariidae

The family Stercorariidae are, in general, medium to large birds, typically with grey or brown plumage, often with white markings on the wings. They nest on the ground in temperate and arctic regions and are long-distance migrants.

South Polar skua, Stercorarius maccormicki
Brown skua, Stercorarius antarcticus

Gulls, terns, and skimmers
Order: CharadriiformesFamily: Laridae

Laridae is a family of medium to large seabirds, the gulls, terns, and skimmers. Gulls are typically grey or white, often with black markings on the head or wings. They have stout, longish bills and webbed feet. Terns are a group of generally medium to large seabirds typically with grey or white plumage, often with black markings on the head. Most terns hunt fish by diving but some pick insects off the surface of fresh water. Terns are generally long-lived birds, with several species known to live in excess of 30 years.

Silver gull, Chroicocephalus novaehollandiae (A)
Kelp gull, Larus dominicanus 
Arctic tern, Sterna paradisaea (A)
Antarctic tern, Sterna vittata

Penguins
Order: SphenisciformesFamily: Spheniscidae

The penguins are a group of aquatic, flightless birds living almost exclusively in the Southern Hemisphere. Most penguins feed on krill, fish, squid and other forms of sealife caught while swimming underwater.

King penguin, Aptenodytes patagonicus
Adelie penguin, Pygoscelis adeliae (A)
Gentoo penguin, Pygoscelis papua
Chinstrap penguin, Pygoscelis antarctica (A)
Erect-crested penguin, Eudyptes sclateri (A)
Macaroni penguin, Eudyptes chrysolophus 
Royal penguin, Eudyptes schlegeli  (E)
Southern rockhopper penguin, Eudyptes chrysocome 
Snares penguin, Eudyptes robustus  (A)

Albatrosses
Order: ProcellariiformesFamily: Diomedeidae

The albatrosses are among the largest of flying birds, and the great albatrosses from the genus Diomedea have the largest wingspans of any extant birds.

Gray-headed albatross, Thalassarche chrysostoma 
White-capped albatross, Thalassarche cauta (A)
Salvin's albatross, Thalassarche salvini (A)
Black-browed albatross, Thalassarche melanophris
Light-mantled albatross, Phoebetria palpebrata 
Royal albatross, Diomedea epomophora (A)
Wandering albatross, Diomedea exulans

Southern storm-petrels
Order: ProcellariiformesFamily: Oceanitidae

The southern storm-petrels are relatives of the petrels and are the smallest seabirds. They feed on planktonic crustaceans and small fish picked from the surface, typically while hovering. The flight is fluttering and sometimes bat-like.

Wilson's storm-petrel, Oceanites oceanicus (A)
Gray-backed storm-petrel, Garrodia nereis (A)
Black-bellied storm-petrel, Fregetta tropica

Shearwaters and petrels
Order: ProcellariiformesFamily: Procellariidae

The procellariids are the main group of medium-sized "true petrels", characterised by united nostrils with medium septum and a long outer functional primary.

Southern giant-petrel, Macronectes giganteus 
Northern giant-petrel, Macronectes halli
Southern fulmar, Fulmarus glacialoides (A)
Antarctic petrel, Thalassoica antarctica (A)
Cape petrel, Daption capense
Snow petrel, Pagodroma nivea (A) 
Kerguelen petrel, Aphrodroma brevirostris 
Soft-plumaged petrel, Pterodroma mollis (A)
White-headed petrel, Pterodroma lessonii 
Mottled petrel, Pterodroma inexpectata
Blue petrel, Halobaena caerulea 
Fairy prion, Pachyptila turtur 
Broad-billed prion, Pachyptila vittata (A)
Antarctic prion, Pachyptila desolata  
Slender-billed prion, Pachyptila belcheri
Gray petrel, Procellaria cinerea 
White-chinned petrel, Procellaria aequinoctialis (A)
Sooty shearwater, Ardenna griseus
Short-tailed shearwater, Ardenna tenuirostris
Common diving-petrel, Pelecanoides urinatrix 
South Georgia diving-petrel, Pelecanoides urinatrix

Cormorants and shags
Order: SuliformesFamily: Phalacrocoracidae

Phalacrocoracidae is a family of medium to large coastal, fish-eating seabirds that includes cormorants and shags. Plumage colouration varies, with the majority having mainly dark plumage, some species being black-and-white and a few being colourful.

Macquarie shag, Leucocarbo purpurascens (E)

Herons, egrets, and bitterns
Order: PelecaniformesFamily: Ardeidae

The family Ardeidae contains the bitterns, herons and egrets. Herons and egrets are medium to large wading birds with long necks and legs. Bitterns tend to be shorter necked and more wary. Members of Ardeidae fly with their necks retracted, unlike other long-necked birds such as storks, ibises and spoonbills.

Great egret, Ardea alba 
Intermediate egret, Ardea intermedia (A)  
White-faced heron, Egretta novaehollandiae (A)
Little egret, Egretta garzetta (A)
Cattle egret, Bubulcus ibis (A)

Hawks, eagles, and kites
Order: AccipitriformesFamily: Accipitridae

Accipitridae is a family of birds of prey, which includes hawks, eagles, kites, harriers and Old World vultures. These birds have powerful hooked beaks for tearing flesh from their prey, strong legs, powerful talons and keen eyesight.

Swamp harrier, Circus approximans (A)

Swallows
Order: PasseriformesFamily: Hirundinidae

The family Hirundinidae is adapted to aerial feeding. They have a slender streamlined body, long pointed wings and a short bill with a wide gape. The feet are adapted to perching rather than walking, and the front toes are partially joined at the base.

Welcome swallow, Hirundo neoxena (A)

Starlings
Order: PasseriformesFamily: Sturnidae

Starlings are small to medium-sized passerine birds. Their flight is strong and direct and they are very gregarious. Their preferred habitat is fairly open country. They eat insects and fruit. Plumage is typically dark with a metallic sheen.

European starling, Sturnus vulgaris (I)

Thrushes and allies
Order: PasseriformesFamily: Turdidae

The thrushes are a group of passerine birds that occur mainly but not exclusively in the Old World. They are plump, soft plumaged, small to medium-sized insectivores or sometimes omnivores, often feeding on the ground. Many have attractive songs.

Song thrush, Turdus philomelos (A)
Eurasian blackbird, Turdus merula (I)

Finches, euphonias, and allies
Order: PasseriformesFamily: Fringillidae

Finches are seed-eating passerine birds, that are small to moderately large and have a strong beak, usually conical and in some species very large. All have twelve tail feathers and nine primaries. These birds have a bouncing flight with alternating bouts of flapping and gliding on closed wings, and most sing well.

Common redpoll, Acanthis flammea (I)
Lesser redpoll, Acanthis cabaret  (I)
European goldfinch, Carduelis carduelis (I)

See also
List of birds
Lists of birds by region

References

 Barrett, Geoff; Silcocks, Andrew; Barry, Simon; Cunningham, Ross; & Poulter, Rory (2003). The New Atlas of Australian Birds. Melbourne: Royal Australasian Ornithologists Union. 
 Birding-Aus Mailing List Archives
 Christidis, Leslie; & Boles, Walter E. (1994). The Taxonomy and Species of Birds of Australia and its Territories. RAOU Monograph 2. RAOU: Melbourne. 
 Garnett, Stephen T.; & Crowley, Gabriel M. (2000). The Action Plan for Australian Birds 2000. Environment Australia: Canberra. 
 Higgins, P.J. (Ed). (1999). Handbook of Australian, New Zealand and Antarctic Birds. Volume 4: Parrots to Dollarbird. Oxford University Press: Melbourne. 
 Marchant, S.; Higgins, P.J.; & Davies, J.N. (Eds). (1994). Handbook of Australian, New Zealand and Antarctic Birds. Volume 2: Raptors to Lapwings. Oxford University Press: Melbourne.

External links
 Tasmanian Parks & Wildlife Service - Macquarie Island World Heritage Area

 
Macquarie
 
ˇ